Gulliver en el país de los gigantes (Spanish: "Gulliver in the Land of the Giants") is a 1903 Spanish short black-and-white silent film directed by Segundo de Chomón.

The film is based on the Jonathan Swift's 1726 novel Gulliver's Travels (its second part).

See also 
 List of Spanish films before 1930

References

Notes

Sources

External links 
 

1903 films
Spanish black-and-white films
Spanish silent short films
1903 short films
Films based on Gulliver's Travels
Films directed by Segundo de Chomón
Silent horror films